The Metropolis Management and Building Acts Amendment Act 1878 was an Act of the Parliament of the United Kingdom, which modified the Metropolis Management Act 1855 and the Metropolitan Building Act 1855. The act was used to improve the regulation of standards in buildings, and introduced measures to protect the safety of theatres and music halls.

Contents
Part I contains a prescription to preserve roadways, and prevent buildings from encroaching on them by fences, walls or walls, and then continues to extend powers of regulation to both new and existing theatres and music halls, including the power to make and amend secondary regulations

Part II set rules about the requirements for foundations of buildings, and strengthens the powers of the Metropolitan Board of Works to deal with infractions.

Part III gives powers for the Board to inspect theatres, and to enter houses and other buildings to inspect them, as well as setting out penalties for non-compliance.

Limitations
The act was used to ensure safety in theatres, but only applied to the 'Metropolis' of London and surrounding areas, and whilst other areas referenced the standards, they were not legally enforceable outside London, as was seen when prosecution failed in the case of the Exeter Theatre Royal fire, due to it being in the regions.

References

United Kingdom Acts of Parliament 1878
English tort law